The Arkansas Timberlands (sometimes also called Southern Arkansas or Southwest Arkansas) is a region of the U.S. state of Arkansas generally encompassing the area south of the Ouachita Mountains, south of Central Arkansas and west of the Arkansas Delta. With several different definitions in use by various state agencies, the Arkansas Timberlands is essentially a region known for dense pine and cypress forests covering hilly terrain and lining numerous rivers. Modern settlement created a significant logging industry and subsequent clearance agriculture which provided the basis of the local economy until the discovery of petroleum. Local tourism is largely based on the popularity of deer hunting and bass fishing. Attractions there include Marks' Mills Battleground Historical Monument, Jenkins' Ferry Battleground Historical Monument, Overflow National Wildlife Refuge, Felsenthal National Wildlife Refuge, South Arkansas Arboretum, Arkansas Museum of Natural Resources, White Oak Lake State Park, Poison Springs Battleground State Park, Millwood State Park, and Pond Creek National Wildlife Refuge. The Arkansas Timberlands is the birthplace of former President of the United States Bill Clinton.

Definition
The region can be roughly defined by Sevier County in the northwest, a portion of Jefferson County in the northeast, Ashley County in the southeast, and Miller County in the southwest. Some notable towns there include Star City, Monticello (home of the University of Arkansas at Monticello School of Forest Resources, the state's only Forestry school), Crossett, El Dorado, Bearden, Camden, Magnolia, Smackover, Hope, and Texarkana.

The region can also be defined as the Arkansas segment of the Piney Woods.

Counties within the Arkansas Timberlands region:

Ashley County
Bradley County
Calhoun County
Cleveland County
Columbia County
Dallas County
Drew County
Grant County
Hempstead County
Howard County
Jefferson County
Lafayette County
Lincoln County
Little River County
Miller County
Nevada County
Ouachita County
Pike County
Sevier County
Union County

See also

References

Regions of Arkansas